The 1934–35 season was the 61st season of competitive football by Rangers.

Overview

Results
All results are written with Rangers' score first.

Scottish League Division One

Scottish Cup

Appearances

See also
 1934–35 in Scottish football
 1934–35 Scottish Cup

External links
 Video clip of the Scottish Cup final, by Pathé News

Scottish football championship-winning seasons
Rangers F.C. seasons
Rangers